Mark C. Brickell is a trader in the derivatives industry..  He was a managing director at J.P. Morgan and served as chairman of the International Swaps and Derivatives Association from 1988 to 1992.

In 1989 and 1990 he was sent by JP Morgan to New Zealand to deal with the failure of Development Finance Corporation (DFC), which was a government-owned development bank.   He was tasked with unwinding their swaps portfolio, which resulted in the largest corporate finance advisory fee ever earned by JP Morgan at that time.

In 1993 he was a principal author of the influential Group of Thirty study "Derivatives: Practices and Principles", which suggested that internal risk controls and best practices at financial institutions, including mark to market, and not government regulation, would facilitate safe and efficient trading of derivatives by the financial industry.

In 1996 he served on the board of directors of the CME Depository Trust, an Illinois-based bank which was created for the purposes of moving collateral between banks.  This was a centralized collateral depository facility established by the CME.

In 1998 he was sent by JP Morgan to Korea to try and recover up to $700 million in defaulted swaps contracts from state-owned banks, and is reported to have recovered more than half of that money.

He worked at JP Morgan Securities for nearly 25 years, and was present when credit default swaps were first conceived at a bankers' retreat in Florida in 1994.

I've known people who worked on the Manhattan Project," says Mark Brickell, who at the time was a 40-year-old managing director at JPMorgan. "And for those of us on that trip, there was the same kind of feeling of being present at the creation of something incredibly important.

As a policy shaper and strategist for the derivatives industry, in 1994 Brickell led an effort to defeat legislation proposed by Congressman Jim Leach (R-IA) that would have regulated the OTC derivatives industry. Leach proposed the legislation after his staff produced a 900-page study on the market. Other members of the House of Representatives, including Henry B. Gonzalez and Edward Markey (D-MA), supported regulation of the derivatives industry.

In his book Infectious Greed, author Frank Partnoy, who was interviewed by "60 Minutes" in October 2008, recounts the battle over the 1994 legislation, which Brickell and the derivatives industry won.

In 1995, after Baring Brothers, one of England's largest and oldest merchant banks collapsed from the unbridled derivatives trading of a single trader, Brickell was interviewed by Charlie Rose on PBS Television. Brickell explained that Baring didn't have adequate internal controls in place.

In 1998 Brickell wrote a letter to Congress opposing derivatives regulations.

In 2003, President Bush nominated Mark Brickell to become the chief regulator at OHFEO (over Fannie Mae and Freddie Mac) when Armando Falcon resigned after releasing his prescient 2003 study on systemic GSE risk. Congress held hearings on his nomination (http://bulk.resource.org/gpo.gov/hearings/108s/95603.pdf), but it was subsequently withdrawn when opponents pointed out that Brickell had led the charge against regulation in the derivatives industry.

Brickell served as the CEO of Blackbird, a Charlotte, North Carolina-based company that enables real-time electronic trading of OTC derivatives of all types. He holds an M.B.A. from Harvard Business School and a B.A. from the University of Chicago. (Company website)

See also
OTC derivatives

References

 Newsweek, "The Monster That Ate Wall Street: How 'credit default swaps'—an insurance against bad loans—turned from a smart bet into a killer." http://www.newsweek.com/id/161199
 http://marketpipeline.blogspot.com/2008/06/derivative-thinking.html
 60 Minutes program dated October 26, 2008 on credit default swaps

Financial regulation in the United States
Year of birth missing (living people)
Living people
University of Chicago alumni
Harvard Business School alumni